Staetherinia is a genus of moths in the subfamily Lymantriinae. The genus was erected by Arthur Gardiner Butler in 1878.

Species
Staetherinia alyzia Dognin, 1920 French Guiana
Staetherinia cayugana Schaus, 1920 Guatemala
Staetherinia corydona (Druce, 1898) Panama
Staetherinia dodona (Druce, 1898) Panama
Staetherinia semilutea (Walker, 1866) Pará in Brazil
Staetherinia valstana Schaus, 1927 Panama

References

Lymantriinae